Colin Bell may refer to:

Colin Bell (academic) (1942–2003), English academic
Colin Bell (footballer, born 1946) (1946–2021), English international footballer
Colin Bell (footballer, born 1961), English football coach
Colin Bell (journalist), journalist, broadcaster and author
Colin Bell (footballer, born 1979), Mauritian footballer 
Colin Bell (Australian politician) (born 1941), member of the Legislative Council of Western Australia
Colin Bell (American politician) (born 1981), member of the New Jersey Senate